Larry Dean (born 13 December 1989) is a Scottish stand-up comedian. His comedy routines have earned him several awards including Scottish Comedian of the Year.

Career

Dean grew up in the South Side of Glasgow. He started his stand-up career in 2010 whilst he was a student at the University of Southampton.

His show Out Now told the story of coming out to a strict Catholic family. Farcissist (2016) was about his life after coming out, his long-term relationship, and readjusting to the dating scene. His Fandan (2017), loosely wrapped around the central story of sitting in a café with two murderers, was among the ten best-reviewed Edinburgh Festival Fringe shows in 2017.

In 2017 he appeared on Live at the Apollo with Gary Delaney, Comedy Central UK's Roast Battle against Sofie Hagen, and on BBC's Mock the Week  in 2018 and Michael McIntyre's Big Show in 2019 along with another appearance on Roast Battle Season 3, Episode 1, this time against Tom Allen.

Dean's act combines his Glaswegian accent and sexuality to create comedic tension, which is emphasised by the conflict between stereotypes.

Awards

Dean was voted the winner of the 2016 Amused Moose Comedy Award at the Edinburgh Festival by members of the comedy industry panel. The basis for the award was his show Farcissist.

In 2013, Dean was named Scottish Comedian of the Year and Bath Comedy Festival's New Act of the Year.

Dean's 2017 show 'Fandan' was rated the 6th Best Reviewed Show of Edinburgh Fringe 2017 by British Comedy Guide 

He was shortlisted for the Edinburgh Comedy Award (Best Newcomer) in 2015 for 'Out Now' and Best Show Award in 2018 and 2022 for 'Bampot' and ‘Fudnut’ Edinburgh Comedy Awards.

References

External links
 
 Larry Dean on Chortle

Scottish stand-up comedians
Scottish male comedians
21st-century Scottish comedians
Comedians from Glasgow
Living people
1989 births
Gay comedians
Scottish LGBT entertainers
British LGBT comedians